Gymnopilus pratensis is a species of mushroom in the family Hymenogastraceae.

See also

List of Gymnopilus species

External links
Gymnopilus pratensis at Index Fungorum

pratensis